Ponche crema is a cream-based liqueur that originates in Venezuela and was brought to nearby  Trinidad and Tobago who developed their own version, Ponche de Crème. Recipes vary depending on the region, but main ingredients typically include milk, eggs, sugar, rum, and other minor ingredients such as vanilla, nutmeg, cinnamon, and lemon rind. A variant type is prepared with concentrated liquid coffee or instant coffee powder. However, most references to the ponche crema name aim at a traditional commercial product, available since 1900, whose recipe and manufacturing process are kept secret. Ponche crema is a beverage traditionally served during Christmas time, much as eggnog is in the United States. It is usually served cold, in small cups, either as an aperitif or a pousse-café.

The origin of the recipe for this commercial product could not be determined.

External links

"Ponche Crema" brand website
Allrecipes' Ponche Crema Procedure

Cream liqueurs
Venezuelan cuisine
Venezuelan alcoholic drinks
Christmas food